The Cəhriçay ( Dzhagrichay) is a river in the Babek District (Nakhchivan Autonomous Republic) in Azerbaijan.
It is a right tributary of the Naxçıvançay, itself a tributary of the Aras. The water sources of the Cəhriçay are snow, rain and groundwater. The river is mostly used for irrigation. It flows through the village Cəhri.

References

Babek District
Rivers of Azerbaijan